Belahar is a village in Dharwad district of Karnataka, India.

Demographics
As of the 2011 Census of India there were 302 households in Belahar and a total population of 1,486 consisting of 759 males and 727 females. There were 179 children ages 0-6.

References

Villages in Dharwad district